Kushmandi Government College, established in 2015, is the government degree college in  Kushmandi,  Dakshin Dinajpur district. It offers undergraduate courses in arts. It is affiliated to University of Gour Banga.

Departments

Arts

Bengali
English
Political Science
History
Philosophy

See also

References

External links
Kushmandi Government College
University of Gour Banga
University Grants Commission
National Assessment and Accreditation Council

Government colleges in West Bengal
Universities and colleges in Dakshin Dinajpur district
Colleges affiliated to University of Gour Banga
Educational institutions established in 2015
2015 establishments in West Bengal